Along with the Gods: The Last 49 Days is a 2018 South Korean  fantasy action film directed by Kim Yong-hwa and based on a webtoon by Joo Ho-min, Along With the Gods. It serves as the sequel to the 2017 film Along with the Gods: The Two Worlds. It stars Ha Jung-woo, Ju Ji-hoon, Kim Hyang-gi, Ma Dong-seok and Kim Dong-wook. The film was released on August 1, 2018.<ref name=wellgo>{{cite web |title=Along with the Gods: The Last 49 Days |url=http://www.wellgousa.com/films/along-with-the-gods-the-last-49-days |publisher=Well Go USA Entertainment|accessdate=August 1, 2018}}</ref>

 Plot 
The three grim reapers Gang-rim (Ha Jung-woo), Haewonmak (Ju Ji-hoon) and Lee Deok-choon (Kim Hyang-gi) will guide their 49th soul Kim Soo-hong (Kim Dong-wook) to the underworld trials. Meanwhile, God of the House (Ma Dong-seok) will recover the grim reapers' memories from 1,000 years ago.

 Cast 

 Main 
 Ha Jung-woo as Gang-rim
 Ju Ji-hoon as Haewonmak 
 Kim Hyang-gi as Lee Deok-choon
 Ma Dong-seok as Seongju
 Kim Dong-wook as Kim Soo-hong

 Supporting 
 Doh Kyung-soo as Private Won Dong-yeon 
 Lee Joon-hyuk as First Lieutenant Park Moo-shin
 Nam Il-woo as Heo Choon-sam
 Ye Soo-jung as Soo-hong's mother
 Jung Ji-hoon as Heo Hyun-dong
 Jung Ah-mi as Kang Rim
 Oh Hee-joon as Translator soldier of Goryeo 
 Kim Myung-gon
 Jo Han-cheol as Judge 
 Jung Yoo-ahn

 Special appearance 
 Lee Jung-jae as Yeomra 
 Sung Dong-il 
 Kim Min-jong as Afterlife Messenger

 Production 
 Along With the Gods Part 1 and 2 took  (around ) to produce. Both parts of the film were shot simultaneously. Dexter Studios, one of Asia's largest film production and visual effects studios, who was behind director Kim Yong-hwa's previous film Mr. Go (2013), created the visual effects for the film. It was reported that around 300 artists and technicians took part in the film's production.
 Chinese production company Alpha Pictures invested $2.2 million.
 Filming began on May 26, 2016, and ended on March 22, 2017, for part 1 and 2.
Some scenes that featured actors Oh Dal-su and Choi Il-hwa were re-shot due to their controversies as they were replaced with substitute actors.

 Reception 

 Critical response 

Elizabeth Kerr of The Hollywood Reporter gave a mixed review and wrote, "Though the two films were shot simultaneously, there’s a sense of 'more' to Along with the Gods: The Last 49 Days that doesn't really do it any service. Like many a sequel bent on topping its predecessor to prove the first entry wasn't a fluke, the end result is just a bigger, noisier, less focused slog rather than continued world-building."

Noel Murray of Los Angeles Times gave a mixed review and wrote, "While Along with the Gods: The Last 49 Days is awkwardly bloated, it does eventually develop some momentum. Once viewers get accustomed to a movie that can move within minutes from courtroom drama to dinosaur attacks, they may enjoy the overwhelming spectacle of it all."

 Box office 

 South Korea 
Prior to its release, Along with the Gods: The Last 49 Days set the record for the highest pre-sale tickets in South Korea's box office history with 60.5% reservation rate. The rate reached 42 million, outdoing the record of the 2017 film The Battleship Island which reached the same number of reservations on the day before the opening of the film.

The film also broke the opening day record in South Korea by attracting 1,263,788 viewers on the first day of its release, which is more than twice the amount of Along with the Gods: The Two Worlds (422,339 viewers). On the second day of its release, the film attracted more than 2 million viewers. On August 4, the film attracted 1,466,416 viewers, making the film set a record of the most viewers in a single day, surpassing Avengers: Infinity War that attracted 1,333,310 viewers in a single day before. On August 5, it was reported that Along with the Gods had attracted 5,409,817 viewers on its fifth day, making the film the fastest to reach such number, surpassing Along with the Gods: The Two Worlds which set the record in a week, and The Admiral: Roaring Currents, the first most viewed film in Korea, which set the record in a six days. Along with the Gods placed first in the weekly box office. The film accumulated $46.2 million from 6.2 million admissions. Along with the Gods holds the record for the fastest film to reach 7, 8 and 9 million views in South Korean box office history. It passed 10 million views on August 16, 2018. The film passed 12 million views as of August 30, 2018, becoming the 13th most-watched film of all time in South Korea.

 Taiwan 
On its first day of release, Along with the Gods: The Last 49 Days scored 37 million. It became the film with the biggest opening week gross for any Korean film in Taiwan, scoring 5.8 million in ticket sales in a week. The film had the third-highest first week sales after Avengers: Infinity War and Jurassic World: Fallen Kingdom in Taiwan.

 Hong Kong 
Prior to its official release, Along with the Gods: The Last 49 Days scored 8 million in pre-sale in Hong Kong. On its day of release in Hong Kong, the film earned 3.18 million, topping the box office. On August 9, the film reached 10 million and scored 20 million on its fourth day of its release, achieving the highest first week sales in Hong Kong.

 Other countries Along with the Gods: The Last 49 Days'' had the biggest opening week gross for any Korean film in North America, Australia, New Zealand and Taiwan.

Awards and nominations

Sequels
Third and fourth installments are currently in development, with Kim Yong-hwa returning to direct the sequels.

References

External links 
  at Lotte Entertainment 
 
 
 Along with the Gods: The Last 49 Days at Naver

2018 action drama films
2010s fantasy drama films
2018 films
South Korean courtroom films
2010s fantasy action films
Films about the afterlife
Films based on South Korean webtoons
Films based on Korean myths and legends
Films directed by Kim Yong-hwa
2010s Korean-language films
Live-action films based on comics
Lotte Entertainment films
Films about personifications of death
South Korean action drama films
South Korean fantasy drama films
South Korean sequel films
2010s South Korean films